The FBI's Ten Most Wanted Fugitives during the 1970s is a list, maintained for a third decade, of the Ten Most Wanted Fugitives of the United States Federal Bureau of Investigation.

FBI headlines in the 1970s
As a decade, the 1970s are marked by the passing of the Hoover era. J. Edgar Hoover had formed and defined the Bureau for nearly a half century. He was succeeded by a long list of short-term directors throughout the Nixon – Ford – Carter era who could not match Hoover's larger persona. Eventually, Director William H. Webster brought stability to Bureau, during the President Reagan era.

On the 1970s top 10 list, perhaps the most notable is the 2nd appearance of James Earl Ray, in 1977. Additionally, in 1971 the list was completely filled with long-time fugitives, who persistently evaded capture, leading to the very first year in which the FBI found it impractical to add any new fugitives to the top ten list. In 1970, the FBI had packed the list with an extraordinary number of "Special Additions" of whom most evaded capture. Consequently, the 1971 list opened with a total of sixteen wanted fugitives at large, nearly twice as many as would typically appear on the list at any other given time. By the end of the year 1971, three of the listed wanted fugitives had been captured, bringing the opening 1972 list down to a still extraordinarily large number of thirteen fugitives. Due to further removals from the list in 1972, the FBI found justification to finally list a single new Fugitive late that year.

FBI 10 Most Wanted Fugitives to begin the 1970s
The FBI in the past has identified individuals by the sequence number in which each individual has appeared on the list. Some individuals have even appeared twice, and often a sequence number was permanently assigned to an individual suspect who was soon caught, captured, or simply removed, before his or her appearance could be published on the publicly released list. In those cases, the public would see only gaps in the number sequence reported by the FBI. For convenient reference, the wanted suspect's sequence number and date of entry on the FBI list appear below, whenever possible.

As the decade began, the following fugitives were the FBI's Ten Most Wanted:

The tenth space had just opened up at the end of the year 1969, but was promptly filled by a new individual on the list in the first week of 1970.

FBI Most Wanted Fugitives added during the 1970s
The most wanted fugitives listed in the decade of the 1970s include (in FBI list appearance sequence order):

1970–1974

1975–1979

End of the decade
By the end of the decade, the following fugitives were remaining at large on the FBI's Ten Most Wanted list:

FBI directors in the 1970s
J. Edgar Hoover (1935–1972) 
Clyde Tolson (May 2–3, 1972)*
L. Patrick Gray (1972–1973)*
William D. Ruckelshaus (1973)*
Clarence M. Kelley (1973–1978) 
James B. Adams (1978)*
William H. Webster (1978–1987)
*Acting director

References

External links
Current FBI Top Ten Most Wanted Fugitives

1970s in the United States